The 2019 South and Central American Men's Club Handball Championship the 1st edition of this tournament was held in Taubaté, Brazil from 22 to 26 May 2019. It acted as a qualifying tournament for the 2019 IHF Super Globe.

Participating teams
 SAG Villa Ballester
 UNLu
 Handebol Taubaté
 EC Pinheiros
 Ovalle Balonmano
 Luterano de Valparaíso
 Colegio Alemán
 Scuola Italiana

Preliminary round

Group A

All times are local (UTC–3).

Group B

Knockout stage

Bracket

5–8th place bracket

5–8th place semifinals

Semifinals

Seventh place game

Fifth place game

Third place game

Final

Final standing

References

External links
Brazilian Handball Confederation website
Championship website

South and Central American Men's Club Handball Championship
South and Central American Men's Club Handball Championship
S
South and Central American Men's Club Handball Championship
South and Central American Men's Club Handball Championship